Alejandra Pérez Lecaros (born 11 January 1963) is a Chilean politician and lawyer.

She worked at Canal 13.

References

External links
 Alejandra Pérez Lecaros at LinkedIn

1963 births
Living people
Chilean people
Pontifical Catholic University of Chile alumni
21st-century Chilean politicians
Women government ministers of Chile
Culture ministers of Chile